Bishop Moore may refer to any of the following persons named Moore who served as a Bishop:
 Arthur James Moore, Bishop of the Methodist Episcopal Church, South, the Methodist Church and the United Methodist Church
 Benjamin Moore (bishop) (1748–1816), Bishop of the American Protestant Episcopal Church
 David Hastings Moore (1838–1915), Bishop of the Methodist Episcopal Church
 Bishop John Moore may refer to:
 John Moore (bishop of Ely) (1646–1714), British scholar
 John Moore (archbishop of Canterbury), Archbishop of Canterbury, 1783–1805
 John Moore (bishop of St Augustine) (1834–1901), Bishop of St. Augustine, Florida
 John Moore (Methodist bishop), Bishop of the Methodist Episcopal Church, South
 John Moore (Bishop of Bauchi) (born 1942), Bishop of Bauchi, Nigeria